Introducing Joe Gordon is the debut album by American jazz trumpeter Joe Gordon featuring tracks recorded in late 1954 and released on the EmArcy label.

Reception

Allmusic awarded the album 4 stars stating "Most of the tunes are originals based on the chord changes of standards, and Gordon sounds in fine form in this swinging setting".

Track listing
All compositions by Joe Gordon except as indicated
 "Toll Bridge" - 6:30     
 "Lady Bob" (Quincy Jones) - 6:59     
 "Grasshopper" (Jones) - 6:59     
 "Flash Gordon" - 7:39     
 "Bous Bier" - 6:49     
 "Xochimilco" - 6:15  
  Evening Lights  -  4:21 
  Body And Soul -  4:25

Recorded at Fine Sound Studios in New York City on September 3 (tracks 3, 4 & 6) and September 8 (tracks 1, 2 & 5), 1954

Personnel 
Joe Gordon - trumpet
Charlie Rouse - tenor saxophone 
Junior Mance - piano
Jimmy Schenck - bass  
Art Blakey - drums

References 

1955 debut albums
Joe Gordon (musician) albums
EmArcy Records albums